Aberrations of the Mind is the ninth album and final album by Swedish heavy metal band Morgana Lefay, released 19 March 2007. It was their first album with Pelle Åkerlind on drums.

The original name was Primal Chaos, which was changed to Aberrations of the Mind during the winter of 2007.

The album got reviews of 8/10 from Rockhard.de, as well as reviews from Terrorverlag and Powermetal.de.

Songs 

All music and lyrics written by Morgana Lefay.

"Delusions" – 3:14
 "Make a Wish" – 3:18
 "The Rush of Possession" – 3:57
 "Depression" – 4:18
 "Caught in the Treadwheel" – 3:55
 "Reflections of War" – 3:46
 "Face of Fear" – 3:23
 "Where I Rule" – 3:36
 "In Shadows I Reign" – 4:31
 "Aberration of Mind" – 4:00
 "Vultures Devouring" – 3:34
 "Over and Over Again" – 5:54

The digipak version of the album has the song "Nightmares Are Made in Hell" as a bonus track.

Credits 
 Charles Rytkönen  – vocals
 Tony Eriksson  – guitars
 Peter Grehn  – guitars
 Fredrik Lundberg  – bass
 Pelle Åkerlind  – drums

References 

Morgana Lefay albums
2007 albums